Colleen Leigh Violet Farrington (August 5, 1936 – October 12, 2015) was an American model, Playboy Playmate, and nightclub singer. She was the mother of actress Diane Lane.

Career
Farrington was born in Lordsburg, New Mexico, the daughter of Eleanor Biggs. She started work as a fashion model in New York City and was a particular favorite of fashion designer Oleg Cassini. She also had some acting roles. She was Playboy magazine's Playmate of the Month for its October 1957 issue. Her pictorial was photographed by Peter Basch.

Personal life
Farrington married acting coach Burton Eugene Lane, and divorced him in 1965, shortly after their  daughter, Diane Lane, who went on to become an Academy Award-nominated actress, was born. She later settled in Georgia and married Lawrence Price.

Farrington died in Jupiter, Florida, on October 12, 2015 at the age of 79.

References

External links
 

1936 births
2015 deaths
1950s Playboy Playmates
Nightclub performers